Jim Protector is a Norwegian alternative rock group. The band was formed in 2001 in Horten, Norway by primary songwriters Alexander Svanberg and Jarle Nordaas. They are best known for their radio hit "Jim Protector's guide to self-pity" (from their EP with the same name released in 2004).

History
Jim Protector was formed in 2001 by primary songwriters Alex and Jarle, who released the 7-inch EP "Half Finished/Half Begun" in 2002. In 2004 Jim Protector released their second EP called "Jim Protectors guide to self-pity", engineered and produced by Thomas Ruud, from the Norwegian rock-act Mohammed.

Most members of Jim Protector are currently studying in Trondheim, Norway where an old storage room in a closed down smelting-plant serves as a studio and practice-arena. Jim Protector is now a fourpiece including the drummer Andreas and the guitar-player Stein Ove.

Jim Protector released their debut album "Shields Down" the summer of 2007, which includes a collaboration with lo-fi legend Jad Fair (Half Japanese, Teenage Fanclub, Yo La Tengo) and Ken Stringfellow from The Posies who has been mixing the album as well.

Members

Current
 Alexander Svanberg - Bass, Vocals
 Jarle Nordaas - Guitar, Vocals
 Stein Ove Eriksen - Guitar, Synth (2004–Present)
 Andreas Solem Kjær - Drums (2004–Present)

Past
 Sondre Graasvoll - Guitar (2001–2004)
 Anders Lindvig - Drums (1992, 2001–2004)
 Ola Emil Moss - Guitar (2003)
 Mats Alnæs - Drums (2004)

Discography

Albums/Box Sets
 Shields Down (Switch Off Records, 2007).

Singles/EPs
 Jim Protectors guide to self-pity (Switch Off Records, 2004).
 half finished / half begun (2002).

Compilation/Soundtrack contributions
 "Half Finished/Half Begun" on slagendagen 5 år (2002).
 "Waking Up With Me" and "Jim Protector's guide to self-pity" on Resolutt Julejazz vol. 5 (2004).
 "The Tunnel" and "The Hallmark Channel" on Resolutt Julejazz vol. 7 (2006).

External links
 Official website

Norwegian indie rock groups
Electronica music groups
Power pop groups
Norwegian alternative rock groups
Musical groups established in 2001
2001 establishments in Norway
Norwegian electronic music groups
Musical groups from Horten
Musical groups from Trondheim